The NSDAP Office of Military Policy (German: Wehrpolitisches Amt der NSDAP, W.P.A. or WPA, literally "NSDAP Office of Defense Policy" in English) was a Nazi Party organization. It was established on 8 September 1932 in a decree by Adolf Hitler, was led by Franz Ritter von Epp and Anton Haselmayer, and housed in the same building as the NSDAP Office of Foreign Affairs, headed by Alfred Rosenberg.

During the remilitarization of Germany, started by the Nazis shortly after they took power, its avowed aim was to "clarify military-political questions, to conduct propaganda campaigns for the purpose of creating a belligerent spirit and a better understanding of military matters among the people, and to control all activities in the fields of military politics and sciences."

This attempt to gain sole authority in all matters of defense education and training brought it into conflict with the Defense Ministry, which objected to this intrusion into its monopoly on arms-bearing. As a result, it was dissolved in 1935, which did not bother Hitler; aside from the propaganda and war ministries there were also numerous other institutions and organizations already concerned with the 'remilitarization' of the German people.

See also

Amt Rosenberg
NSDAP Office of Colonial Policy
NSDAP Office of Foreign Affairs
NSDAP Office of Racial Policy

References

Nazi Party organizations
Organizations disestablished in 1935